The Benjamin Haines House, also known as the Haines Farmstead and the Haddon-Scott House, is one of the oldest buildings in the Town of Montgomery in Orange County, New York, United States. It is located at 114 Coleman Road southeast of the village of Walden.

Built by Haines around 1750, the house later passed into the ownership of the Haddon and then Scott families. Members of the latter owned it until 1994. Improvements and renovations in the early 19th century gave it a Greek Revival look.

It has been on the National Register of Historic Places since 1996.

See also

National Register of Historic Places listings in Orange County, New York

References

Houses on the National Register of Historic Places in New York (state)
Houses in Orange County, New York
National Register of Historic Places in Orange County, New York
Houses completed in 1750